Peeter Rahnel (born 23 February 1957 in Abja-Paluoja) is an Estonian politician. He has been member of XIV Riigikogu.

In 2011 he graduated from University of Tartu in history speciality.

1994-1996 he was the mayor of Abja-Paluoja.

Since 1991 he is a member of Estonian Centre Party.

References

Living people
1957 births
Estonian Centre Party politicians
Members of the Riigikogu, 2019–2023
Mayors of places in Estonia
University of Tartu alumni
People from Abja-Paluoja